His Majesty's Loyal Opposition, or the Official Opposition in Gibraltar, is led by the Leader of the Opposition. This is usually the political party with the second largest number of seats in the Gibraltar Parliament, as the largest party will usually form the government. Since the 2011 General Election, the Official Opposition has been the Gibraltar Social Democrats (GSD) led by Peter Caruana (2011–2013), Daniel Feetham (2013-
–2017), Roy Clinton as Interim Opposition Leader and now Keith Azopardi.

The current composition of the Opposition is the following:

See also 
 Parliamentary opposition

References

External links 
 
 

Politics of Gibraltar
Parliamentary opposition